The Bayer School of Natural and Environmental Sciences (BSNES) is a fully accredited degree-granting institution and the primary college of undergraduate and graduate scientific research at Duquesne University in Pittsburgh, Pennsylvania. It was formed in 1994 with the separation of the Biological Sciences, Chemistry, and Biochemistry departments from the former College of Liberal Arts and Sciences, and subsequently named in honor of the Bayer Corporation. The school currently houses the departments of Biological Sciences, Biotechnology, Biochemistry, Chemistry, Environmental Science & Management, Forensic Science & Law, and Physics. The school also collaborates closely with the Duquesne University School of Pharmacy. In 2010, the department of Chemistry and Biochemistry was designated as a Mass Spectrometry Center of Excellence by Agilent Technologies, allowing for collaborative research into metabolics, proteomics, disease biomarkers, and environmental analysis. In 2011, Duquesne University became one of 98 universities nationwide, and one of nine Catholic universities, to be designated as a high research activity institution by the Carnegie Foundation.

Areas of study

Bachelor of Science (B.S.) programs offered
 Biological Sciences
 Biochemistry
 Chemistry
 Environmental Chemistry
 Environmental Science
 Physics, with available concentrations in Astronomy, Condensed Matter, Education, or broad track

Bachelor of Arts (B.A.) programs offered
 Biochemistry
 Physics

Master of Science (M.S.) programs offered
 Biochemistry
 Biological Sciences
 Biotechnology
 Chemistry
 Education
 Environmental Science & Management, with available concentration in Conservation Biology
 Forensic Science & Law

Doctor of Philosophy (Ph.D.) programs offered
 Biochemistry
 Biological Sciences
 Chemistry

Research facilities

Analytical and spectroscopic research

Collaborative arrangements with other basic and applied science departments have led to the joint operation of such facilities as the Sony Microscopy Laboratory featuring state-of-the-art transmission and scanning electron microscopes and associated computer imaging facilities, the X-Ray Crystallography Facility, featuring a Rigaku AFC7R diffractometer, two powder diffractometers and associated computing equipment. Designated as a Mass Spectrometry Center of Excellence to Study Diseases and Environmental Issues by Agilent Technologies, the Department of Chemistry & Biochemistry has a research facility equipped with state-of-the-art chromatography and spectroscopy instrumentation. Some instruments housed in the facility include:

 Agilent Rapid Resolution liquid chromatograph (LC)
 Agilent HPLC-Chip/MS systems
 Agilent Mass Quadrupole Time of Flight LC/MS
 Agilent Triple quadrupole LC/MS
 Agilent Mass Time of Flight MS
 Two Agilent Gas Chromatography/ICP-MS
 Two Agilent Gas Chromatography/EI/CI-MS
 Gerstel MultiPurpose Sampler equipped with SPME, SBSE, and TDU
 Bruker ESI  
 Bruker 400 MHz multinuclear NMR Spectrometer
 Varian 400 MHz and 500 MHz NMR spectrometers
 SGI Itanium-2 supercomputers
 Numerous other spectrophotometric and chromatographic instruments

The center was founded by Dr. Mitch Johnson (1962–2010) and Dr. H.M. "Skip" Kingston of the department of Chemistry & Biochemistry.

Biological research

The Biological Sciences department operates the Center for Metals in Biological Systems, which was designed to "provide a center of expertise in metals in natural and synthetic materials focused on structure-function relationships and the development of new applications." The center is operated by Dr. Partha Basu of the department of Chemistry and Biochemistry.

Computational sciences

The Institute for Computational Sciences is an interdisciplinary organization of faculty members, postdoctoral fellows, graduate and undergraduate students from the Departments of Chemistry and Biochemistry, Physics, Mathematics, and Computer Sciences. The institute was founded with the purpose of "consolidating expertise at Duquesne University that fosters interdisciplinary research in computational sciences, provides novel educational experiences for students, and creates joint funding opportunities."

Microwave assisted chemistry

The Center for Microwave and Analytical Chemistry (C/MAC) is a chemical research center founded by Dr. H.M "Skip" Kingston and the Bayer School of Natural and Environmental Sciences. The Center is dedicated to collaborative research, technology transfer and professional education in microwave, environmental, and analytical chemistry, sample preparation and analysis. The Center "solves real problems and meets analysis needs through fundamental, practical, and innovative research and transfers these technologies and methodologies to national and international laboratories and industry."

Biotechnology

The Center for Biotechnology is an interdisciplinary organization of researchers from the Duquesne University School of Pharmacy, the Bayer School of Natural and Environmental Sciences, and the Rangos School of Health Sciences. Its mission is to enhance the innovative development and application of biotechnology through an interdisciplinary, coordinated research effort across the University, thereby contributing to society and the improvement of the quality of life. Priorities for the Center include: increasing connectivity both within and outside of Duquesne University, providing collaborative research programs and grant proposals, providing seminars and educational programs supporting translational science, and the improvement of core infrastructure. Specific areas of interest include devices and diagnostics, drug discovery, drug delivery, gene therapy, bioremediation, bioinformatics, microbial engineering, analytical methods, pharmaceutics, compliance, and rehabilitation.

Administration
Office of the Dean

Dr. Philip Reeder, Dean

Department of Biological Sciences

Dr. Joseph R. McCormick, Chair

Center for Biotechnology

Dr. Alan W. Seadler, Director

Department of Chemistry and Biochemistry

Dr. Ellen Gawalt, Chair

Center for Environmental Research and Education

Dr. John F. Stolz, Director

Department of Forensic Science and Law

Dr. Frederick W. Fochtman, Director

Department of Physics

Dr. Simonetta Frittelli, Chair

References

External links
 The Bayer School of Natural and Environmental Sciences website
 The Duquesne University School of Pharmacy Website
 The Agilent Technologies Website

School Bayer
Educational institutions established in 1994
1994 establishments in Pennsylvania